Jimmie Johnson is an American race car driver for the Hendrick Motorsports team who has won seven Drivers' Championships in the NASCAR Cup Series. He entered NASCAR part-time in the Busch Series in 1998 with the ST Motorsports and later Curb Agajanian Performance Group teams. Johnson drove eight races for Herzog Motorsports in the 1999 Busch Series, and spent two full seasons with the team in 2000 and 2001 before moving to Hendrick Motorsports in the 2001 Winston Cup Series. He was runner-up to Matt Kenseth in 2003 and Kurt Busch in 2004, before winning five successive Cup Series championships from 2006 to 2010, breaking Cale Yarborough's record of three consecutive titles from 1976 to 1978. Johnson claimed a further two titles in 2013 and 2016 to tie Dale Earnhardt and Richard Petty with seven career Cup Series championships.

He achieved his first NASCAR victory at the 2001 Sam's Club Presents the Hills Brothers Coffee 300 Busch Series round at Chicagoland Speedway on July 14. Johnson took his maiden Cup Series win at the 2002 NAPA Auto Parts 500 at California Speedway in a season in which he registered three victories. He won 18 races in his first four full seasons with Hendrick Motorsports, including a season-high eight in 2004. Johnson took his first Cup Series championship in 2006 with five wins. He enjoyed his most successful season in terms of race victories with ten in 2007. In Johnson's following three seasons with Hendrick Motorsports, he won no less than six races. He managed only two wins in 2011 and five in 2012. Johnson won six more times as he took his sixth championship in 2013. This was followed by four wins in 2014, five each in 2015 and his seventh championship victory in 2016 and three in 2017. Johnson's most recent victory in NASCAR came at the 13th round of the 2017 season at the 2017 AAA 400 Drive for Autism at Dover International Speedway.

Over the course of his racing career, he won a total of 84 NASCAR races, 83 of which were in the Cup Series. Johnson also won one race in the NASCAR Busch Series. He also won the Daytona 500 twice in 2006 and 2013. , Johnson ranks sixth on the all-time Cup wins list with 83, tied with Yarborough. He is most successful at Dover International Speedway, where he claimed eleven victories, including a season sweep of wins at the track in 2002 and 2009. Johnson's largest margin of victory in his career was at the 2008 Subway Fresh Fit 500 at Phoenix International Raceway, a race where he finished 7.002 seconds ahead of the second-placed Clint Bowyer of the Richard Childress Racing team, while the narrowest was in the 2011 Aaron's 499 at Talladega Superspeedway, where he beat Bowyer by 0.002 seconds, one of the closest finishes in NASCAR.

NASCAR

Cup Series

In the NASCAR Cup Series, which was sponsored by Winston, Nextel, Sprint, and Monster Energy during Johnson's career, Johnson, the seven-time Cup Series champion for Hendrick Motorsports has won 83 races. Throughout his career, he has won at 20 of the 25 tracks at which he raced on, leaving the Charlotte Roval, Daytona Road Course, Chicagoland Speedway, Kentucky Speedway, Rockingham Speedway and Watkins Glen International the six tracks where he has failed to win. As of the end of the 2019 Monster Energy NASCAR Cup Series, Johnson's 83 wins rank sixth all-time tied with Cale Yarborough, behind Richard Petty (200), David Pearson (105), Jeff Gordon (93), Bobby Allison (84) and Darrell Waltrip (84).

Key:
 No. – Victory number; for example, "1" signifies Johnson's first race win.
 Grid – The position on the grid from which Johnson started the race.
 Margin – Margin of victory, given in the format of seconds.milliseconds; caution indicates the race was ended by a yellow flag for an accident or inclement weather
  – Driver's Championship winning season.

Busch Series
In NASCAR's second-level series, variously known as the Busch Series, and Nationwide Series during Johnson's driving career and now as the Xfinity Series, Johnson won a single race, the 2001 Sam's Club Presents the Hills Brothers Coffee 300 at Chicagoland Speedway. That win occurred during the period in which Anheuser-Busch's Busch beer brand was series sponsor.

Number of wins at different tracks
The  symbol indicates Johnson won at a track twice in a calendar year.

See also
 List of all-time NASCAR Cup Series winners

Notes

References

Wins
Career achievements of racing drivers
NASCAR-related lists